Below are the results of season 1 of the World Poker Tour (2002–2003).

Results

Five Diamond World Poker Classic
 Casino: Bellagio, Paradise, Nevada
 Buy-in: $10,000
 5-Day Event: May 27, 2002 to June 1, 2002
 Number of Entries: 146
 Total Prize Pool: $1,391,180
 Number of Payouts: 18
 Winning Hand: K-K

Legends of Poker
 Casino: Bicycle Casino, Los Angeles 
 Buy-in: $5,000
 2-Day Event: August 30, 2002 to August 31, 2002
 Number of Entries: 134
 Total Prize Pool: $583,380
 Number of Payouts: 10
 Winning Hand: Q-Q Ultimate Poker Classic
 Casino: Palm Beach, Aruba
 Buy-in: 2-Day Event: October 9, 2002
 Number of Entries: 100
 Total Prize Pool: $74,400
 Number of Payouts:4
 Winning Hand: Costa Rica Classic
 Casino: Casinos Europa, San José
 Buy-in: $500 w/ $500 Re-buys
 1-Day Event: October 19, 2002
 Number of Entries: 134
 Total Prize Pool: $234,858
 Number of Payouts: 10

 Gold Rush
 Casino: Lucky Chances Casino, Colma, California
 Buy-in: $3,000
 2-Day Event: November 10, 2002 to November 11, 2002
 Number of Entries: 152
 Total Prize Pool: $456,000
 Number of Payouts: 18

 World Poker Finals
 Casino: Foxwoods Resort Casino, Mashantucket, Connecticut
 Buy-in: $10,000
 3-Day Event: November 14, 2002 to November 17, 2002
 Number of Entries: 89
 Total Prize Pool: $915,000
 Number of Payouts: 10

 World Poker Open
 Casino: Binion's Horseshoe, Tunica, Mississippi
 Buy-in: $10,000
 4-Day Event: January 28, 2003 to January 31, 2003
 Number of Entries: 160
 Total Prize Pool: $1,600,000
 Number of Payouts: 27
 Winning Hand: 6-5

Euro Finals of Poker
 Casino: Aviation Club de France, Paris 
 Buy-in: €10,000 ($10,790)
 3-Day Event: February 12, 2003 to February 15, 2003
 Number of Entries: 86
 Total Prize Pool: €831,000 ($894,510)
 Number of Payouts: 9

L.A. Poker Classic
 Casino: Commerce Casino, Los Angeles 
 Buy-in: $10,000
 4-Day Event: February 21, 2003 to February 24, 2003
 Number of Entries: 136
 Total Prize Pool: $1,360,000
 Number of Payouts: 20

Party Poker Million
 Buy-in: $5,300 
 1-Day Event: March 6, 2003
 Number of Entries: 177
 Total Prize Pool: $1,013,800
 Number of Payouts: 9

World Poker Challenge
 Casino: Reno Hilton, Reno
 Buy-in: $5,000
 3-Day Event: March 31, 2003 to April 2, 2003
 Number of Entries: 87
 Total Prize Pool: $421,746
 Number of Payouts: 9

WPT Championship
 Casino: Bellagio, Las Vegas 
 Buy-in: $25,000
 5-Day Event: April 14, 2003 to April 18, 2003
 Number of Entries: 111
 Total Prize Pool: $2,691,750
 Number of Payouts: 28

Other Events
During season 1 of the WPT there was one special event that did not apply to the Player of the Year standings:
 The WPT Invitational – February 25–26, 2003 – Commerce Casino – postscript to Event #8: L.A. Poker Classic

References 

World Poker Tour
2002 in poker
2003 in poker